Edward James Burns (October 31, 1887 – June 1, 1942) was an American professional baseball player. He played all or part of seven seasons in Major League Baseball, from 1912 until 1918, for the St. Louis Cardinals and Philadelphia Phillies, primarily as a catcher. 

Burns died on June 1, 1942. He is buried at San Carlos Cemetery in Monterey, California.

References

External links

Major League Baseball catchers
St. Louis Cardinals players
Philadelphia Phillies players
Alameda Encinals players
Oakland Commuters players
Sacramento Sacts players
Tacoma Tigers players
Montreal Royals players
Saint Mary's Gaels baseball coaches
Saint Mary's Gaels baseball players
Baseball players from California
1887 births
1942 deaths